Estoloides sordida is a species of beetle in the family Cerambycidae. It was described by John Lawrence LeConte in 1873. It is known from Baja California in Mexico.

References

Estoloides
Beetles described in 1873